Kiss Me Again is a 1925 American silent romantic comedy film directed by Ernst Lubitsch. It stars Marie Prevost, Monte Blue, and Clara Bow. The film was based on the French play Divorçons! (1880), by Victorien Sardou and Émile de Najac, and the adapted version of the play Cyprienne.

Plot
As described in a film magazine review, infatuated with her music teacher, LouLou decides to leave her husband. Her husband takes a room at the club. When the time for the divorce arrives, the husband returns home to get his clothes and his wife persuades him to stay. She has suspected him of having another woman and is disgusted by the "other man."

Cast

Box Office
According to Warner Bros records, the film earned $318,000 domestically and $76,000 in foreign markets.

Preservation
The film is now considered lost. Warner Bros. records of the film's negative have a notation, "Junked 12/27/48" (i.e., December 27, 1948). Warner Bros. destroyed many of its negatives in the late 1940s and 1950s due to nitrate film pre-1933 decomposition. No copies of Kiss Me Again are known to exist.

See also
Let's Get a Divorce (1918)
That Uncertain Feeling (1941)
List of lost films

References

External links

The AFI Catalog of Feature Films: Kiss Me Again

1925 films
1925 romantic comedy films
American romantic comedy films
American silent feature films
American black-and-white films
Comedy of remarriage films
American films based on plays
Films based on works by Victorien Sardou
Films directed by Ernst Lubitsch
Lost American films
Warner Bros. films
1925 lost films
Lost romantic comedy films
1920s American films
Silent romantic comedy films
Silent American comedy films
1920s English-language films